Kęstutis Navickas (born 13 June 1970) is a Lithuanian politician and environmentalist. Navickas served as the Minister of Environment in the Skvernelis Cabinet from 2016 until 2018.

On 7 December 2020, he was approved to serve as Minister of Agriculture in the Šimonytė Cabinet.

Biography
He studied at a secondary school in Kaunas, then in 1988 he graduated from a vocational technical school, where he acquired the specialty of electrical mechanic.

In 1988 he joined Kaunas Youth Monument Protection Club "Atgaja". From 1991 to 1992 he worked at a private folk craft school. In 1992 in the Publishing House of Cultural Publications "Taura", where he took care of the preservation of Kaunas Fortress II fort. From 1992 to 1995 he worked in the Kaunas City Division of the Cultural Heritage Department, where he took care of the protection of the archeological and militaristic heritage of Kaunas City. From 1995 to 1998 he was the Chairman of the "Atgaja".

In 1999 he graduated with a bachelor's degree in history from Vilnius University. In 2009 he graduated from the master's degree Program in Sustainable Development Management and Administration at Mykolas Romeris University.

From 1998 to 2006 he worked as the Director of the Lithuanian branch of the regional environmental center for Central and Eastern Europe. Since 2006 he was Baltic Non-Governmental Organization "Baltic Environmental Forum", Deputy Sustainable Development Expert and deputy director.

From 2016 to 2018 was Minister of Environment of Lithuania in the Skvernelis Cabinet.

Since 2019 he has been working in the private sector.

In 2020 he joined Homeland Union and participated in the Seimas elections.

References

|-

1970 births
Living people
Homeland Union politicians
21st-century Lithuanian politicians
Vilnius University alumni
Mykolas Romeris University alumni